Lalmonirhat-2 is a constituency represented in the Jatiya Sangsad (National Parliament) of Bangladesh since 2014 by Nuruzzaman Ahmed of the Awami League.

Boundaries 
The constituency encompasses Aditmari and Kaliganj upazilas.

History 
The constituency was created in 1984 from the Rangpur-6 constituency when the former Rangpur District was split into five districts: Nilphamari, Lalmonirhat, Rangpur, Kurigram, and Gaibandha.

Members of Parliament

Elections

Elections in the 2010s 
Nuruzzaman Ahmed was elected unopposed in the 2014 general election after opposition parties withdrew their candidacies in a boycott of the election.

Elections in the 2000s

Elections in the 1990s

References

External links
 

Parliamentary constituencies in Bangladesh
Lalmonirhat District